Georg Hellmesberger Jr. (27 January 1830 – 12 November 1852) was an Austrian violinist and composer.

Biography
Born in Vienna, he was the son of Georg Hellmesberger Sr. and the brother of Joseph Hellmesberger Sr. He studied violin with his father and composition with Ludwig Rotter (1810–1895).

In 1847 made a concert tour through Germany and England.

In 1850, he became court concertmaster and director of vaudeville and ballet music in Hanover. Shortly before his premature death in Hanover, he became Kapellmeister.

Works
His works include operas (Die Bürgschaft, 1848 and Die beiden Königinnen, 1851) symphonies, chamber music, and solo pieces for violin.

References
Material from the three biographies under External links

External links

Biography of Hellmesberger family members (in German)
Biography 
Biography 

1830 births
1852 deaths
Austrian Romantic composers
Austrian opera composers
Male opera composers
Austrian classical violinists
Hellmesberger family
Musicians from Vienna
19th-century classical composers
19th-century classical violinists
Male classical violinists
19th-century male musicians